Harry Alfred Robert Kupfer (12 August 1935 – 30 December 2019) was a German opera director and academic. A long-time director at the Komische Oper Berlin, he worked at major opera houses and at festivals internationally. Trained by Walter Felsenstein, he worked in the tradition of realistic directing. At the Bayreuth Festival, he staged Wagner's Der fliegende Holländer in 1978 and Der Ring des Nibelungen in 1988. At the Salzburg Festival, he directed the premiere of Penderecki's Die schwarze Maske in 1986 and Der Rosenkavalier by Richard Strauss in 2014.

Career 
Born in Berlin, Kupfer studied theatre at the Theaterhochschule Leipzig from 1953 to 1957. He was the assistant director at the Landestheater Halle, where he directed his first opera, Dvořák's Rusalka, in 1958. From 1958 to 1962, he worked at the Theater Stralsund, then at the Theater in Karl-Marx-Stadt, from 1966 as opera director at the Nationaltheater Weimar, also lecturing at the Hochschule für Musik Franz Liszt, Weimar from 1967 to 1972. In 1971, he staged as a guest at the Staatsoper Berlin Die Frau ohne Schatten by Richard Strauss.

Kupfer was opera director at the Staatsoper Dresden from 1972 to 1982. In 1973, he staged abroad for the first time: Elektra by Richard Strauss at the Graz Opera. He was from 1977 professor at the Hochschule für Musik Carl Maria von Weber Dresden. In 1978, he was invited to direct Der fliegende Holländer at the Bayreuth Festival, conducted by Dennis Russell Davies. He staged the story in a psychological interpretation as the heroine Senta's imaginations and obsessions.

Kupfer was chief director at the Komische Oper Berlin from 1981, a protégé of Walter Felsenstein. Simultaneously, he was professor at the Hochschule für Musik "Hanns Eisler" in Berlin. At the opera, he staged Mozart operas in the order of their composition, including Die Entführung aus dem Serail in 1982 and Così fan tutte in 1984. He also staged there Wagner's Die Meistersinger von Nürnberg in 1981, Puccini's La Bohème in 1982, Reimann's Lear, Verdi's Rigoletto and Mussorgsky's Boris Godunov in 1983, among many others. He directed there the premiere of Judith by Siegfried Matthus. In 1988, he staged at the Bayreuth Festival Wagner's Der Ring des Nibelungen.  The Los Angeles Times called the production "high-tech kitsch ... a bizarre stylistic jumble"; The Guardian remarked on a Götterdämmerung "full of paltry gimmickry"; and The Times commented that "the production gets progressively lazier [and] peters out in the clichés of the day before yesteryear, which Kupfer doubtless thinks the last word in modernity".

Kupfer premiered several operas, including Udo Zimmermann's  at the Staatstheater Dresden in 1973, conducted by Siegfried Kurz. He staged the GDR premiere of Schönberg's Moses und Aron there, also conducted by Kurz in 1975. Kupfer co-wrote the libretto with composer Krzysztof Penderecki of Penderecki's opera Die schwarze Maske. He directed the 1986 world premiere production in Salzburg and the US premiere production at the Santa Fe Opera in 1988.

Kupfer and his wife, the music teacher and soprano , had a daughter, who is an actress.

He died on 30 December 2019 in Berlin.

Style 
Kupfer worked in the tradition of realistic directing, as developed by Walter Felsenstein and practised especially at the Komische Oper Berlin. The works are interpreted with a focus on implications drawn from them; actions on stage, conflicts and the development of drama are related to the score and to the logic of relationships between the characters. Kupfer always worked individually with the singers, including the choir members, requesting talent for acting and rendering credibility to the actions. Kupfer supported Giorgio Strehler's belief in a "human theatre" ("menschliches Theater"). The characters are, in the tradition of Bertolt Brecht's method of dialectic theatre, always placed in historic political context, which determines their actions at least partly.

Productions 
The Akademie der Künste lists several of his productions, including:
 1958: Dvořák: Rusalka, Halle

 1971: Richard Strauss: Die Frau ohne Schatten, Staatsoper Berlin, Otmar Suitner
 1972: Mozart: Die Hochzeit des Figaro, Staatstheater Dresden, Siegfried Kurz
 1972: Verdi: Otello, Staatsoper Berlin, Wolfgang Rennert
 1973: Udo Zimmermann: , premiere, Staatstheater Dresden, Siegfried Kurz
 1975: Schönberg: Moses und Aron, GDR first performance, Staatstheater Dresden, Siegfried Kurz
 1975: Wagner: Tristan und Isolde, Staatstheater Dresden, Marek Janowski
 1975: Berg: Wozzeck, Opernhaus Graz, Gustav Erny
 1976: Borodin: Prince Igor, Det Kongelige Teater, Wolfgang Rennert
 1976: Udo Zimmermann: Der Schuhu und die fliegende Prinzessin, premiere, Staatstheater Dresden, Max Pommer
 1977: Richard Strauss: Elektra, De Nederlandse Opera, Amsterdam, Michael Gielen

 1978: Wagner: Der fliegende Holländer, Bayreuth Festival, Dennis Russell Davies
 1979: Berg: Lulu, Oper Frankfurt, Michael Gielen
 1980: Tchaikovsky: Eugen Onegin, Staatstheater Dresden, Herbert Blomstedt
 1981: Leoš Janáček: Jenůfa, Oper Köln, Gerd Albrecht
 1981: Richard Wagner: Die Meistersinger von Nürnberg, Komische Oper Berlin, Rolf Reuter
 1982 to 1990: Mozart Cycle (1982 Die Entführung aus dem Serail, 1984 Così fan tutte, 1986 Die Zauberflöte, 1986 Die Hochzeit des Figaro, 1987 Don Giovanni, 1990 Idomeneo), Komische Oper Berlin
 1983: Reimann: Lear, Komische Oper Berlin, Hartmut Haenchen
 1984: Puccini: La Bohème, Komische Oper Berlin, Volksoper Wien, Ernst Märzendorfer
 1984: Handel: Giustino, Komische Oper Berlin, Hartmut Haenchen
 1985: Handel: Belsazar, Hamburgische Staatsoper, Gerd Albrecht
 1986: Penderecki: Die schwarze Maske, premiere, Salzburg Festival, Woldemar Nelson
 1987: Bernd Alois Zimmermann: Die Soldaten, Staatstheater Stuttgart, Dennis Russell Davies
 1988: Wagner: Der Ring des Nibelungen, Bayreuth Festival, Daniel Barenboim
 1989: Richard Strauss: Elektra, Wiener Staatsoper, Claudio Abbado
 1989: Tchaikovsky: Die Jungfrau von Orleans, Bavarian State Opera, Gerd Albrecht
 1991: Georg Katzer: Antigone oder die Stadt, premiere, Komische Oper Berlin, Jörg-Peter Weigle
1992: Michael Kunze/Sylvester Levay: Elisabeth, premiere, Theater an der Wien, Caspar Richter
 1992: Richard Wagner: Parsifal, Staatsoper Berlin, Daniel Barenboim
 1993: Berlioz: La damnation de Faust, Royal Opera House, Colin Davis
 1994: Mussorgsky: Khovanshchina, Hamburgische Staatsoper, Gerd Albrecht
 1995: Wagner: Die Meistersinger von Nürnberg, De Nederlandse Opera Amsterdam, Gerd Albrecht
 1996: Wagner: Lohengrin, Staatsoper Berlin, Daniel Barenboim
 1997: Verdi: Macbeth, Bavarian State Opera, Mark Elder
 1998: Henze: König Hirsch, Komische Oper Berlin, Yakov Kreizberg
 1999: Michael Kunze/Sylvester Levay: Mozart!, premiere, Theater an der Wien, 
 2000: Mozart: Titus, Komische Oper Berlin, Yakov Kreizberg
 2000: Reimann: Bernarda Albas Haus, premiere, Bavarian State Opera, Zubin Mehta
 2001: Schoeck: Penthesilea, Florence, Gerd Albrecht
 2002: Britten: The Turn of the Screw, Komische Oper Berlin, 
 2003/04: Wagner: Der Ring des Nibelungen, Liceu, Barcelona, Sebastian Weigle
 2005: Weill: Aufstieg und Fall der Stadt Mahagonny, Semperoper, Sebastian Weigle
 2009: Pfitzner: Palestrina, Oper Frankfurt, Kirill Petrenko
 2010: Richard Strauss: Ariadne auf Naxos, Theater an der Wien, Bertrand de Billy
 2013: Prokofiev: Der Spieler, Oper Frankfurt, Sebastian Weigle
 2014: Richard Strauss: Der Rosenkavalier, Salzburg Festival, Franz Welser-Möst
 2014: Wagner: Parsifal, New National Theatre, Tokyo, Taijiro Iimori
 2015: Glinka: Iwan Sussanin, Oper Frankfurt, Sebastian Weigle
 2016: Beethoven: Fidelio, Staatsoper Berlin, Daniel Barenboim
 2016: Shostakovich: Lady Macbeth von Mzensk, Bavarian State Opera, Kirill Petrenko
 2018: Verdi: Macbeth, Staatsoper Unter den Linden, Daniel Barenboim

Recordings 
Among his productions available on DVD are:
 Bernd Alois Zimmermann's Die Soldaten
 Strauss’ Elektra (Vienna State Opera 1989)
 Wagner's Der fliegende Holländer (Bayreuth 1985)
 Wagner's Der Ring des Nibelungen (Bayreuth)
 Wagner's Der Ring des Nibelungen (Gran Teatre del Liceu, Barcelona, 2005)

Awards 
Kupfer was a member of the Akademie der Künste in Berlin, the Freie Akademie der Künste in Hamburg, and the Sächsische Akademie der Künste in Dresden. His awards included:
 1968: Kunstpreis der DDR
 1983: Nationalpreis der DDR I. Klasse für Kunst und Literatur
 1985: Deutscher Kritikerpreis
 1993: Frankfurter Musikpreis
 1994: Order of Merit of Berlin
 1994: 
 2002: Knight Commander's Cross of the Order of Merit of the Federal Republic of Germany
 2005: Silbernes Blatt of the

Bibliography 
 : Harry Kupfer inszeniert an der Komischen Oper Berlin. Richard Wagner Die Meistersinger von Nürnberg 1981; Wolfgang Amadeus Mozart Die Entführung aus dem Serail, 1982; Giacomo Puccini La Bohème, 1982; Aribert Reimann Lear, 1983; Giuseppe Verdi's Rigoletto, 1983; Modest Mussorgski's Boris Godunov 1983; Wolfgang Amadeus Mozart Così fan tutte 1984 (Theaterarbeit in der DDR 11, Documentation), Berlin 1987.
 Dieter Kranz: Der Regisseur Harry Kupfer „Ich muß Oper machen“ Kritiken, Beschreibungen, Gespräche. Berlin 1988.
 Dieter Kranz: Berliner Theater. 100 Aufführungen aus drei Jahrzehnten, Berlin 1990
 Dieter Kranz: Der Gegenwart auf der Spur. Der Opernregisseur Harry Kupfer. Henschel, Berlin 2005,

Further reading

Obituaries

References

External links 
 
 
 Harry Kupfer Operabase
 R. Wagner, Parsifal, (new production) Finnish National Opera / 4 April 2005 (BK) musicweb-international.com 2005
 Wagner, R.: Götterdämmerung (Liceu, 2004) (NTSC) Naxos Records

1935 births
2019 deaths
Theaterhochschule Leipzig alumni
German opera directors
Recipients of the National Prize of East Germany
Members of the Academy of Arts, Berlin
Knights Commander of the Order of Merit of the Federal Republic of Germany
Recipients of the Order of Merit of Berlin
People from Berlin